Halfin is a surname. Notable people with the surname include:

Ross Halfin (born 1957), British rock and roll photographer
Eliezer Halfin (1948–1972), Israeli wrestler who died in the Munich massacre

See also
Halkin (surname)